Giuseppe Mascitelli (born 9 November 1959) graduated from the University of Urbino. He is president of Filmare GroUP, a holding company (which is processed in SpA by the year) which includes all the initiatives of its main shareholder, the family Mascitelli and deals with activities around the world of communication, but not limited to; its activity is summarized by the slogan 'Experience Makers'. Filmare GroUP includes Mascitelli & Partners, an initiative to share with the major institutions of the banking and insurance a wealth experiences and knowledge about communication, training and research in these sectors. Founder, in 1998, along with Ennio Doris, of Alboran SPA (with which he has implemented the first European TV Company in finance), is also co-founder in 2006 of Mobango Ltd, one of the world's first Mobile Community. Always up to date with technological innovation, Mascitelli has implemented its digital ecosystem with numerous platforms connected with www.giuseppemascitelli.com aggregator.
Giuseppe Mascitelli has been with the Mediolanum Group since its birth, making a strong imprint both to the communication side of the group and to the important strategic choices it has made. He has been CEO of Mediolanum Communications S.p.A., a board member of the Mediolanum Corporate University S.p.A. and business management consultant of Banca Mediolanum S.p.A.

Early life and education
Giuseppe Mascitelli was born on 9 November 1959 in Porto San Giorgio, a small town in Marche overlooking the Adriatic sea. He attended a scientific high school, first in Fermo then in Civitanova Marche, a school that well represented his interests towards humanistic subjects and as well as scientific ones. Strong ties together with constant patronage tie him to his father's land, Abruzzo, whose mountainous harshness and proud population has always fascinated him.

He left his family at a young age to dedicate himself to his university studies, which he financed by working in various jobs. He traveled often in Europe and stopped for several months in Northern Germany near Marberg and Essen in order to become more confident with German in view of  his very complex graduation thesis.

In 1983 he graduated with top honours in History of Philosophy with a thesis on “Max Stirner - The Ego and Its Own” at the University of Urbino. In that same year he started a master in Economics at the same university, finishing in 1985. From 1983 to 1990 he shifted his attention to the financial sector, attending  training courses at Programma Italia S.p.A. (a financial course, sales, supervising, manager, top manager, 3 editions of the Kaiser course). Also in 1990 he received his final trainer diploma for the European GRID method. Finally in 1994 he completed the advanced masters from  Programma Italia S.p.A. concentrated on Financial and Insurance markets.

Career
Giuseppe Mascitelli's has worked in the banking world and television.

Banking
Meeting Ennio Doris in 1983 was the turning point in Giuseppe's journey into the banking world. From 1983 to 1988 he is first an agent, then supervisor  and finally manager at Programma Itaia S.p.A. In 1988 he changed roles and became head of training for central Italy, a position that he maintained until 1990 - the year of his second turning point - that lead him to become business management consultant of the same company until 1997. This position was renewed by Banca Mediolanum S.p.A. until 2011.  From 2008 to 2011 he has also been a member of the board of Mediolanum Corporate University S.p.A.

Creative world
His path in communications - both in terms of promotional and management tools, as well as company training - took place parallel to his banking activities from the early 1980s. In this period a full-fledged strategy is implemented, varying from the production of a series of popular publications created to bring Italian clients closer to the investment world, and to the design and implementation of one of the first - and today's most popular - European company TV stations. In 1994 Giuseppe became  Sole Director of Filmare S.a.S, an office that he maintained until 2009. From 1998 to 1999 he was president of Magic General Media S.p.A., leaving to become, in the same year,  President and then CEO of Alboran S.p.A. until 2005. From 1996 to 2011 he has also CEO Of Mediolanum Communication S.pA., a company that was established with the aim of managing the entire communications branch (from Branding to all international events) of Banca Mediolanum.

Communication

Other activities
In the 1990s we find the design and production of one of the first and most popular in-company TV stations, defined by Ennio Doris as “the real secret weapon of Banca Mediolanum”. This experience will later be applied to the creation of other company TV stations  such as Pirelli & C. Real Estate, Wellcome datamatic S.p.A. and the Deutsche Bank Group. In this period we have the creation and  implementation of the Mediolanum Tour, a traveling show that has involved hundreds of thousands of spectators. In the last decade  the design and the launch of the Mediolanum Channel is to be remembered, a theme channel in cooperation with Sky, and of the Mediolanum Market Forum, a cross-media format currently transmitted live in four languages -  both on the Internet platform as well as via satellite. He has been the designer and creator of all Banca Mediolanum events and conventions.

TV programs
Giuseppe Mascitelli has been author and creator of various television programs. In the 1990s he planned of some of the first telesales on Italian television, carried out in the Mediaset  studios in 1992 with Marco Columbro; next we find “Pensione Completa” broadcast on the syndications Rete A and Odeon TV, with the TV debut of Ennio Doris and “ Una città per cantare “ which sees the return of Mike Bongiorno live, a format that was later inherited by Maurizio Costanzo and Fiorello. Also in the 1990s he directed the  show  and created the DVD of a live Milan concert of Fausto Leali. In the last decade, he created many formats for Mediolanum Channel from “Gente di mare” to “ Piccolo fratello” but what really needs to be remembered in particular are the experimental activities  carried out in new media - an unexpected format for Italian culture - such as “My virtual boy”, the first  ideal programmable boy via Web and presented during the Future Show of the same year (the project gave rise to a movie produced by Warner Bros) and “BlackCube”, a reality format similar to Grande Fratello, in which the participants were forced into a closed environment, precisely the black cube, and they had to resolve 6 enigmas posed by a computer. Their story was filmed and transmitted both via website and satellite channels, which could be altered and enriched by public participation through special web-live interfaces. “BlackCube”, in 2001 had over 300,000 hits on line.

Awards
Among the main awards are, in 1995 “ Lifetime achievement Global winner” - Programma Italia S.p.A.;  2001 “Hot Bird TV Award” - Special Prize at the SAT Expo;  2004 “TV digitali in chiaro” a Mediolanum Channel for production refinement - 30 anni di Mille Canali;  2006 “TV programmes” for Piccolo Fratello - Premio Aretè  - responsible for communication;  2008 “1st  prize Convention Aziendale” with the event Anno Domini - Bea, “2nd prize Technical Excellence for the best props  for the event Anno Domini - EuBea;  2009 “1st prize Best Company Event” for Banca Mediolanum, “1st prize Best congress/convention “ with “Inauguriamo l'ottimismo” - Bea.

Trivia
He invented the term “Tecnocreativo” (techno creative) defining a new generation of eclectic professionals ready to operate with new technologies while maintaining a great awareness of human nature and a strong focus towards emotions.

References

External links 
 
 
 

Italian businesspeople
1959 births
Living people
Italian television producers